Zahra Ahmadipour (born 1960 in Malayer, Iran) is an Iranian politician and university professor who was the head of Cultural Heritage, Handcrafts and Tourism Organization from 2016 until 2017. She was formerly Director of administrative divisions of the Ministry of Interior for two times, first from 1997 until 2003 and second time in 2016. She was also Vice President of the Physical Education Organization from 2003 until 2005.

References 

1960 births
Living people
Female vice presidents of Iran
Heads of Cultural Heritage, Handicrafts and Tourism Organization
Islamic Association of University Instructors politicians
Women vice presidents
21st-century Iranian women politicians
21st-century Iranian politicians
People from Malayer